Li Jin or Jin Li may refer to:

 Surname Li
 Li Jin (Tang dynasty) (died 750), nephew of Emperor Xuánzong of Tang
 Jin Li (computer scientist)
 Li Jin (swimmer) (born 1982), Chinese swimmer

 Surname Jin
 Jin Li, Chinese geneticist